Hans Richter (born 14 September 1959) is a former footballer who played as a forward.

During his club career, Richter played for FC Karl-Marx-Stadt, 1. FC Lokomotive Leipzig and Kickers Offenbach. He played 15 times for the East Germany national team, scoring four goals.

External links

1959 births
Living people
East German footballers
East Germany international footballers
Association football forwards
1. FC Lokomotive Leipzig players
Kickers Offenbach players
DDR-Oberliga players
People from Erzgebirgskreis
German footballers
People from Bezirk Karl-Marx-Stadt
Footballers from Saxony